The 2012 Big Sky Conference football season was the 49th season for the Big Sky. The conference began its season on Thursday, August 30, as each of the conference's teams began their respective 2012 season of NCAA Division I Football Championship Subdivision competition.

This was the first Big Sky season for four new conference members—full members North Dakota and Southern Utah, and football-only members Cal Poly and UC Davis.

Rankings

Schedule

Week 1

Week 2

Week 3

Week 4

Week 5

Week 6

Week 7

Week 8

Week 9

Homecoming games
September 22
Northern Colorado @ Montana State
October 6
Montana @ Northern Colorado
October 20
Sacramento State @ Eastern Washington

Attendance

Head coaches

 Tim Walsh, Cal Poly
 Beau Baldwin, Eastern Washington
 Mike Kramer, Idaho State
 Mick Delaney, Montana
 Rob Ash, Montana State
 Chris Mussman, North Dakota
 Jerome Souers, Northern Arizona

 Earnest Collins Jr., Northern Colorado
 Nigel Burton, Portland State
 Marshall Sperbeck, Sacramento State
 Ed Lamb, Southern Utah
 Bob Biggs, UC Davis
 Jody Sears, Weber State

References